Paul Haesaerts (15 February 1901 – 31 January 1974) was a multi talented Belgian artist.

Born as Pauwel Helena Alfons Haesaerts, son of Benjamin Adolf Jan Baptist Haesaerts and Emma Philomena Spillemaeckers.

As an artist he worked as an architect, filmmaker, etcher, painter, screenwriter, carpet designer and illustrator. Especially as a documentary filmmaker he was well known internationally. His short film Visit to Picasso (1949) was awarded at the New York Film Festival in 1950 and won the BAFTA award for best documentary in 1951.

Filmography
Van Renoir tot Picasso (1948, From Renoir to Picasso, De Renoir a Picasso)
Visit to Picasso (1949)

References

External links 
 

1974 deaths
1901 births
20th-century Belgian architects
20th-century Belgian painters